Bharpura Pahlejaghat Junction (Hindi name – भरपुरा पहलेजाघाट जंक्शन), station code PHLG, is a railway station in Sonpur division of East Central Railway. Bharpura Pahlejaghat Junction is located in Sonpur city in Saran district in the Indian state of Bihar. It is located on the north end of Digha–Sonpur rail–road bridge, while Patliputra is on the south end of the bridge. In June 2017, a 20 kW roof top hybrid solar plant with 20% storage facility installed and commissioned at Pahaleja Ghat railway station.

History
Old Pahleja ghat station was operational till 1982. Prior to Mahatma Gandhi Setu opening in 1982, there was regular Steamer service of the Indian Railways between Mahendru Ghat in Patna end and Pahleja Ghat in Sonpur. There was old  metre-gauge line between Pahleja station and Sonepur station. The station was not in use and was left abandoned after opening of Mahatma Gandhi Setu. The new station was built around 3.2 km east from the old station and started on 3 February 2016. The station was earlier named Pahlejaghat Junction, but after protest from the villagers of Bharpura, it was renamed to Bharpura Pahlejaghat Junction in July 2016.  In the 2016 Floods in Bihar, this station worked as relief center for flood victims.

Distance from other stations
The distance from nearby stations are:

Trains

 Gorakhpur–Patliputra Passenger (Train no. 55008)
 Patliputra Gorakhpur Passenger (Train no. 55007)
 Raxaul–Hajipur Intercity Express (Train no. 15202)
 Gorakhpur–Patliputra Passenger (Train no. 55042)
 Sonepur–Gorakhpur Passenger (Train no.55209)
 Patliputra–Barauni DEMU (Train no. 75216)
 Patliputra–Narkatiaganj Intercity (Train no. 25201)

References

External links 

Railway junction stations in Bihar
Sonpur railway division
Railway stations in Saran district
Railway stations opened in 2016